Carroll County Public Schools is a school district based in Westminster, Maryland. CCPS is the ninth largest county in the state of Maryland. Nearly 25,000 students are enrolled in the county's public schools. The school system includes all of Carroll County, Maryland.

Leadership 
The schools are administered by superintendent Mrs. Cynthia McCabe. McCabe was appointed to a four-year term as Superintendent of Carroll County Public Schools effective July 1, 2022.

In 2022, the school board announced in the April meeting that pride flags would be banned from being “flown, posted, or affixed to the grounds, walls, doors, ceilings or any other Board of Education property," after a donation of flags from the local chapter of PFLAG were raised in classrooms. The school board has voted to develop a new policy on the use of political symbols, specifically flags, in school buildings, but the heated debate continues.

The Board of Education consists of five elected Board of Education members and one non-voting student member.

As of May 2022, the members are President Kenneth Kiler, Vice President Tara A. Battaglia, Marsha B. Herbert, Patricia S. Dorsey and Donna M. Sivigny. The current student representative is Devanshi Mistry.

Schools

Other schools
Carroll County Career & Technology Center
Carroll Springs School
Gateway School
Outdoor School

High schools
Francis Scott Key High School
Liberty High School
South Carroll High School
Century High School
Westminster High School
Winters Mill High School
Manchester Valley High School

Middle schools
East Middle School
Mt. Airy Middle School 
North Carroll Middle School
Northwest Middle School
Oklahoma Road Middle School 
Shiloh Middle School 
Sykesville Middle School
West Middle School

Elementary schools
Carrolltowne Elementary School 
Cranberry Station Elementary School 
Ebb Valley Elementary School 
Eldersburg Elementary School 
Elmer A. Wolfe Elementary School 
Freedom District Elementary School 
Friendship Valley Elementary School
Hampstead Elementary School 
Linton Springs Elementary School 
Manchester Elementary School
Mechanicsville Elementary School
Mt. Airy Elementary School 
Parr's Ridge Elementary School
Piney Ridge Elementary School
Robert Moton Elementary School
Runnymede Elementary School 
Sandymount Elementary School
Spring Garden Elementary School 
Taneytown Elementary School 
Westminster Elementary School 
William Winchester Elementary School
Winfield Elementary School

References

External links
Carroll County Public Schools

School districts in Maryland
Westminster, Maryland
Education in Carroll County, Maryland